The white lion is a rare colour mutation of the lion, specifically the Southern African lion. White lions in the area of Timbavati are thought to have been indigenous to the Timbavati region of South Africa for centuries, although the earliest recorded sighting in this region was in 1938. White lions first became known to the English-speaking world in 1977 through the book The White Lions of Timbavati.

Description
White lions are not albinos. Their white color is caused by a recessive trait, called leucism, derived from a less-severe mutation in the same gene that causes albinism, similar to the gene responsible for white tigers. They vary from blonde to near-white. This coloration does not appear to pose a disadvantage to their survival. White lions were considered to have been technically extinct in the wild between 1992 and 2004, when the Global White Lion Protection Trust achieved the first successful reintroduction of white lions to their natural habitat. These prides have continued to hunt and breed successfully in the wild, whilst other occurrences of white lion births have been reported in the greater Kruger region since then.

Breeding and genetics

A recessive gene gives white lions their unusual colors. A similar gene also produces white tigers. White lions can therefore be selectively bred for zoos, animal shows and wildlife parks. Such breeding involves inbreeding and can result in inbreeding depression (genetic defects, reduced fertility, and physical defects), although this has not yet been found to cause hind-limb paralysis or serious heart defects, which would indicate a severe level of inbreeding. Some are concerned about white lions mating with lions of other alleles, due to possible extinction of the white lion allele. However, this is not valid as the offspring will inherit the recessive white gene and therefore make it possible to produce white offspring in a later generation, thus making the allele more widespread. Some critics maintain that white lions should not be introduced into the wild because of the inbreeding that has taken place in zoos and breeding camps. Inbreeding can cause severe problems reproductively, even causing Arnold-Chiari malformation. This causes problems in the brain/skull and the spinal cord, more commonly in humans and dogs. However, ethical reintroduction programs such as The Global White Lion Protection Trust have ensured through the use of scientific methodologies that the lions in their program are not inbred.

White lions of unknown ancestry
 A white lion breeding program is currently underway at Inkwenkwezi Private Game Reserve in South Africa's Eastern Cape province.
 Four white lion cubs were born at the Papanack Park Zoo outside Ottawa. They have since been released into the main reserve with the other tawny lions.
 In March 2017, an attempt to smuggle white lions from Afghanistan to Pakistan was quashed. The origin of the lions was unclear at first, before Border Police Commander-General Ne'matullah Haidari said that they were African. In April 2017, four of the lions were taken to Kabul Zoo, with the other two lions remaining in Kandahar Province.

Lory Park Zoo
Lory Park Zoo is currently in possession of two adult white lions (Daniel and Heidi), who have produced eight cubs. A litter of three cubs was born in 2012 and all three were hand-reared. A second litter of five cubs was born in 2013; three were removed for their own well-being while the remaining two (a male, Gabriel, and a female, Gazelle) were left with the parents. Both cubs are still with the parents and have not been handled by humans. A male cub was traded for other animals in August 2013 and now lives at the Hodonin Zoo in the Czech Republic.

Kruger and Umfolozi
In 1979, three litters containing white lions were recorded in Kruger National Park. In March, a female lion with three white cubs was observed near Tshokwane. In September, three white cubs (from two different lionesses) were seen. Another litter of white female cubs was captured from Kruger National Park and treated for sarcoptic mange. A white lion was observed in the Hluhluwe-Umfolozi Game Reserve in Zululand.

Rustenburg Wildlife Rehabilitation Center
In 2018, Mufasa, a three-year-old, was in the process of being sold in South Africa after he was taken from an owner illegally keeping him as a pet. An anonymous buyer wanted both Mufasa and a female lion named Soraya, intending to protect both. Over 280,000 signed a petition asking that Mufasa not be auctioned, fearing a buyer might just want the lion for hunting.

Eurasia
The European Association of Zoos and Aquaria opposes the deliberate breeding of white lions.

West Midland Safari Park
In 2004, four white lions arrived at West Midland Safari Park, the only white lions in the United Kingdom. Mubuto, the male, and three lionesses (Marin, Natasha, and JoAnn; spellings undocumented) settled into the Kingdom of the White Lion exhibit at the park very well.

Newspapers and bloggers reported that the four cubs born at West Midlands Safari Park, in 2008 had been sold to perform in a Japanese circus. It is alleged that the lions were given to British businessman Jim Clubb, who runs Amazing Animals, which also goes by the name Heythrop Zoological Gardens, in Chipping Norton, Oxfordshire. The animal rights organization Lion Aid, Ltd., quoted Mr. Clubb as saying, first, "No comment," then, "I've no idea if the West Midland Safari Park knew they were going to the circus, that's a matter for them." Bob Lawrence, the Head Keeper of West Midland Safari Park, who appears often in the YouTube videos raising the cubs, told the Worcester News, a local newspaper, that he "would never have supplied the four white lion cubs if he had known they would have ended up performing in a Japanese circus."

Jurques Zoo
In May 2007 four white lion cubs were born at Jurques Zoo in France. The cubs consisted of one male and three females. However, they needed to be hand fed because their mother was not taking proper care of them.

Magan Zoo, Abony
A private zoo in Abony, Hungary recently acquired two white lion cubs, one male and one female lion.

Belgrade Zoo
Belgrade Zoo in Serbia has 12 white lions. In 2010 four were born by two female lions, each weighing about 1.5 kg (3.3 pounds). Four additional white lions were born in April 2011. One more cub was born in October 2013, but died soon after.

Pafos Zoo
Pafos Zoo, an Animal and Bird wildlife park in Cyprus, received two seven-month-old white lion cubs in 2011.

Tbilisi Zoo
In December 2013, four white lion cubs were born at Tbilisi Zoo in Georgia. Cubs needed to be hand fed because their mother wasn't taking proper care of them. Another three cubs were born in May 2014.

Karachi Zoo
In 2012, the Karachi Zoo, Pakistan, purchased a juvenile male and juvenile female white lion. They have had 2 cubs.

Bukit Gambang Safari Park, Malaysia
The first white lions introduced into Malaysia was in March 2013 when the Safari Park in Bukit Gambang Resort City (Pahang) opened its door to the public. With 2 males and 3 females, the first white lion was born in May 2014 and was named King.

Wildlife Park of Sunway Lagoon, Malaysia
A couple of white lions named Zola and Zuri reside in the Sunway Lagoon's Wildlife Park since April 2015.

Singapore Night Safari
Singapore Night Safari, A subsidiary of Wildlife Reserves Singapore, recently acquired two white lions, a male and a female.

Taman Safari Indonesia
Taman Safari acquired six white lions from Canada in 2018.

Crimea Lion Park 
A couple of white lions named Milady and Rocky were born at Taigan Lion Park in Crimea in March 2019.

Americas

Toronto Zoo
In 2012, Toronto Zoo in Canada received three white lions to their African zone and replacing the single white lioness the zoo had since 1996. In September 2015, four white lion cubs were born at the zoo.

Cincinnati Zoo
In 1998, Cincinnati Zoo in Ohio received two white lions from Siegfried & Roy's White Lion exhibit. Prosperity died on January 6, 2020, at the age of 22. Her female cub Gracious died at age 21 on March 3, 2022.

Reino Animal
Mexican zoo Reino Animal, located in Otumba, State of Mexico, also has a couple of white lions which can be seen at the "Safari Leones" (Lions' Safari).

The Wild Animal Sanctuary 
The Wild Animal Sanctuary, located in Keenesburg, Colorado, has at times had white lions rescued from various for-profit zoos or other exploitative situations. All animals at the sanctuary live out the remainder of their lives in large open-air enclosures free from further exploitation.

Oceania

Kingdom of Zion
Kingdom of Zion, a private zoo in New Zealand, possesses six male white lions and four female white lions.

Genetics
Genetically, the white lion is the same subspecies as the tawny South African lion (Panthera leo melanochaita), which is found in some wildlife reserves in South Africa, and in zoological parks around the world. White lions are not albinos, but leucistic. They have pigment visible in the eyes (which may be the normal hazel or golden color, blue-gray, or green-gray), paw pads and lips.  Blue-eyed white lions exist and may be selectively bred.  The leucistic trait is due to a recessive mutation in the gene for Tyrosinase (TYR), an enzyme responsible for the production of melanins. More severe mutations in the same gene have been found to cause albinism in many species, while another less severe mutation in the same gene is responsible for the Chinchilla coloring trait seen in several mammals.  Reduced pigment production decreases the deposition of pigment along the hair shaft, restricting it to the tips.  The less pigment there is along the hair shaft, the paler the lion. As a result, "white" lions range from blonde to near-white. The males have pale manes and tail tips instead of the usual dark tawny or black.
In 2013, the specific genetic marker that determines the unique coloration of white lions was identified, after a 7-year study led by the Global White Lion Protection Trust and partnering several different countries.

In the wild within their natural endemic range
From the 1970s onwards, prized for their rarity, the white lions and many 'normal' coloured (tawny) lions carrying the white lion gene were removed from the wild and put into captive breeding and hunting programs and sent to zoos and circuses around the globe. No adult white lion had been seen in their natural habitat after 1992. The Global White Lion Protection Trust (WLT) therefore initiated a world-first re-establishment of white lions within their natural habitat in 2004, based on successful reintroduction techniques. The wild born offspring of rehabilitated white lions were integrated with resident wild tawny lions, and released through a soft release process. Three prides of white lions of high genetic integrity integrated with tawny lions have been successfully established, and are hunting self-sufficiently in their natural habitat, at a predation rate comparable to the wild tawny lions in the same habitat. The genetic marker determining the white colouration was identified in a collaborative study with 5 other countries in October 2013, and is being used to ensure genetic integrity and ultimately to determine the frequency of occurrence of the gene in the wild population.

The primary aim of the Global White Lion Protection Trust (WLT) is to harness the cultural importance of white lions to local indigenous communities, to help protect the Kruger to Canyon (K2C) Biosphere and the greater lion population in this region. This approach is based on the international precedent of the Kermode Bear (Ursus americanus kermodei) in British Columbia, whereby this rare, white variant of the American black bear (Ursus americanus) has been declared a critically endangered subspecies due to its conservation and cultural value, such that the Kermode Bear is being used as a flagship species for protecting a 4000 000 ha wilderness area. As with the Kermode Bear, by protecting the white lions, their entire population within their endemic area would be protected.

Subsequently, white cubs were born in the Timbavati Private Nature Reserve in 2006, 2008, 2009, 2011, 2012 and 2013, and in the Nwanetsi Area of Kruger National Park in 2014 and 2015, confirming that white lions are a natural occurrence and the recessive gene is still present in the wild population.

In light of the recent decision by South Africa's Department of Environmental Affairs (DEA) at CITES 2016, to continue to allow the hunting of captive bred lions ("canned hunting"), and the trade in lion bones from captive bred lions, the Global White Lion Protection Trust (WLT) asserts that the survival of lions in the Greater Kruger Park Region is likely to come under threat, and the white lion is the ideal capstone animal to help better protect all lions in the Greater Kruger Park Region.

As the proposed policy stands for the management of lions in South Africa, the WLT asserts that the legalization of the lion bone trade will increase the supply and therefore demand of wild lion trophies and especially lion bones, increasing poaching and illegal hunting and threatening the future of wild lion populations in South Africa.

See also
 White Tiger
 Black panther
 Drakenstein Lion Park
 Kimba the White Lion
 King Cheetah
 Melanistic Asiatic lion
 Siegfried & Roy
 White panther
Kermode bear

Notes

References

Further reading

 McBride, Chris "The White Lions of Timbavati" 1977  E. Stanton. 
 McBride, Chris "Operation White Lion" 1981 St. Martin's Press.

External links

 Global White Lion Protection Trust
 White Lions – History, Mythology and Genetics
 Mutant Big Cats – Lions (with genealogy charts)

Panthera leo melanochaita
Mammals of South Africa
Articles containing video clips
Felid color morphs